At the 1992 Summer Olympics, two different gymnastics were contested: artistic gymnastics and rhythmic gymnastics.  The artistic gymnastics events were held at the Palau Sant Jordi from July 26 through August 2.  The rhythmic gymnastics event were held at the Palau dels Esports de Barcelona from August 6 through 8th.

In artistic gymnastics, the New Life rule was introduced at the Olympic Games.  Under this rule, a gymnast's scores in the compulsory and optional rounds were not carried over to the all-around and apparatus finals.  A gymnast's final standing in both the all-around and apparatus finals was based solely on the scores received by the gymnast during those competitions.

Artistic gymnastics

Format of competition
The gymnastics competition at the 1992 Summer Olympics was carried out in three stages:

 Competition I – The team competition and qualification round in which gymnasts, including those who were not part of a team, performed both compulsory and optional exercises.  Only the five highest scores earned by team members on each apparatus during each round were used to determine the overall team total. The thirty-six highest-scoring gymnasts in the all-around qualified to the individual all-around competition. The eight highest-scoring gymnasts on each apparatus qualified to the final for that apparatus.
 Competition II – The individual all-around competition, in which those who qualified from Competition I performed exercises on each apparatus. The final score of each gymnast was determined by adding the scores earned by him or her on each of the six apparatuses in the men's competition and each of the four apparatuses in the women's competition.
 Competition III – The apparatus finals, in which those who qualified during Competition I performed an exercise on the individual apparatus on which he or she had qualified.  The final score of each gymnast determined solely by the score earned by him or her on the apparatus during this competition.

Each country was limited to three gymnasts in the all-around final and two gymnasts in each apparatus final.

Men's events

Women's events

Rhythmic gymnastics

Medal table

See also

1992 World Artistic Gymnastics Championships

References

External links
 Official Olympic Report
 www.gymnasticsresults.com

 
1992 Summer Olympics events
Olympics
1992